The following is a list of notable massive open online course providers (MOOCs) worldwide.

No longer available 

 Coursmos
 Eliademy

References 

E-learning
Higher education-related lists